Avast Antivirus is a family of cross-platform internet security applications developed by Avast for Microsoft Windows, macOS, Android and iOS. The Avast Antivirus products include freeware and paid versions that provide computer security, browser security, antivirus software, firewall, anti-phishing, antispyware, and anti-spam among other services.

Avast launched a freeware business product, Avast for Business, in February 2015. It includes antivirus protection, web threat scanning, browser protection, and a cloud management console.

As of 2017, Avast is the most popular antivirus vendor on the market, and it had the largest share of the market for antivirus applications.

In January of 2020, multiple news sources reported that Avast Antivirus, through a subsidiary, was selling the browsing history of Avast Free product users. Though the company claimed all data was "de-identified", it was reported that the sold data could be linked back to people's real identities, exposing every click and search they had made, but this could not be verified. In response, Avast announced that it would close the subsidiary over the data privacy backlash.

See also 
Avast Secure Browser
Avast SecureLine VPN
Comparison of antivirus software

References 

Avast
Android (operating system) software
Antivirus software
Freemium
MacOS security software
Proprietary software
Windows security software
Gen Digital software